The 1931–32 NHL season was the 15th season of the National Hockey League (NHL). The Ottawa Senators and Philadelphia Quakers suspended operations, leaving eight teams to play 48 games each. In the Stanley Cup Finals, the Toronto Maple Leafs swept the New York Rangers in three games to win the franchise's third Stanley Cup championship.

League business

At the September 26, 1931, NHL meeting, the requests of the Philadelphia Quakers and the Ottawa Senators to suspend their franchises for the season were granted. The eight remaining teams divided up the Ottawa and Philadelphia players, whose contracts were leased from Ottawa and Philadelphia. (The Quakers would not return) The players went to other teams, but their contracts were intended to revert to the original clubs. Ottawa received an offer of $300,000 for the team, on the condition that it could move to Chicago and play in the new Chicago Stadium but the owners of the Chicago Black Hawks refused to allow the new team within their territory. The Detroit Falcons were bankrupt and went into receivership.

Meanwhile, the American Hockey Association, which had become the American Hockey League (AHL) in 1930–31, had declared itself a major league. NHL president Frank Calder condemned the AHL as an outlaw league, citing the team putting a franchise in Chicago, which had an NHL franchise, and a franchise in Buffalo where the NHL had a minor league affiliate. The AHL proposed a Stanley Cup challenge, and the Stanley Cup trustees ordered the NHL to play off. However, the Buffalo team collapsed and Calder entered into negotiations to merge the Chicago Shamrocks, owned by James Norris, with the bankrupt Detroit Falcons. The AHL signed an agreement with the NHL to become its minor league affiliate.

Regular season

Howie Morenz was as effective as ever for the Montreal Canadiens and won the Hart Trophy again, as the Habs once again finished first. The Rangers finished first in the American Division. But it was to be the year of Toronto, with the NHL's leading scorer Harvey "Busher" Jackson leading the way. The Maple Leaf Gardens was built and opened in November 1931, a remarkable achievement. At one point, the whole project was near collapse, but when Conn Smythe and Frank Selke convinced the unions to accept stock in the Gardens as partial payment of wages, Maple Leaf Gardens was built. Chicago spoiled the home opener with a 2–1 win and it was the Black Hawks Mush March who scored the Gardens first goal.

The Montreal Maroons were very interested in obtaining Eddie Shore from Boston. James Strachan, president of the Maroons, said he was willing to pay up to $40,000 for his contract. However, there was no deal. As Boston had fallen to the bottom of the league, it was doubtful that the Bruins would part with their ace defenceman.

Final standings

Playoffs

This was the only time since 1926–27 that three of the final four teams remaining in the playoffs were based in Canada.

Playoff bracket

Quarterfinals

(C2) Toronto Maple Leafs vs. (A2) Chicago Black Hawks

(A3) Detroit Falcons vs. (C3) Montreal Maroons

Semifinals

(C1) Montreal Canadiens vs. (A1) New York Rangers

(C2) Toronto Maple Leafs vs. (C3) Montreal Maroons

Stanley Cup Finals

The Toronto Maple Leafs swept the best-of-five series against the New York Rangers three games to none. The first two games were to be played in New York City but because the circus was in town, the second game was played in Boston. The third and final game was played in Toronto. It was called the "Tennis Series", because the Leafs scored 6 goals in each game.

Awards
Howie Morenz won the Hart Trophy for the second time in his career. Joe Primeau won the Lady Byng, the one time he would win the trophy in his career. Chuck Gardiner won the Vezina, the first of two times he would win the trophy.

All-Star teams

Player statistics

Leading scorers
Note: GP = Games played, G = Goals, A = Assists, PTS = Points, PIM = Penalties in minutes

Source: NHL.

Leading goaltenders
Note: GP = Games played; Mins = Minutes played; GA = Goals against; SO = Shutouts; GAA = Goals against average

Source: NHL.

Coaches

American Division
Boston Bruins: Art Ross
Chicago Black Hawks: Emil Iverson and Godfrey Matheson
Detroit Falcons: Jack Adams
New York Rangers: Lester Patrick

Canadian Division
Montreal Canadiens: Cecil Hart
Montreal Maroons: Sprague Cleghorn
New York Americans: Eddie Gerard
Toronto Maple Leafs: Art Duncan and Dick Irvin

Debuts
The following is a list of players of note who played their first NHL game in 1931–32 (listed with their first team, asterisk(*) marks debut in playoffs):
Art Coulter, Chicago Black Hawks
Earl Seibert, New York Rangers
Ott Heller, New York Rangers

Another notable debut in 1931 was Canadian national radio coverage of Toronto Maple Leafs games on the Canadian National Railway radio network. The program, originally known as the General Motors Hockey Broadcast, evolved over time into the modern CBC TV broadcast of Hockey Night in Canada.

Last games
The following is a list of players of note that played their last game in the NHL in 1931–32 (listed with their last team):
Georges Boucher, Chicago Black Hawks
Art Gagne, Detroit Falcons
Carson Cooper, Detroit Falcons

See also
1931-32 NHL Transactions
List of Stanley Cup champions
Ice hockey at the 1932 Winter Olympics
1931 in sports
1932 in sports

References
 
 
 
 
 

Notes

External links
Hockey Database
NHL.com

 
1931–32 in Canadian ice hockey by league
1931–32 in American ice hockey by league